Chico Arnéz (real name John Claude Davies) was a London-based Latin bandleader of the 1960s and 1970s. Arnez also played bongo drums and authored a textbook on bongo playing (1959).

Arnéz was born in England. He married Margaret Ketchell, with whom he had two children.

Discography
Sound of Chico Arnez
From Chico With Love
Chico
Non Stop Dance PartyThis is Chico, This is KeelyUnknown Soldier Worships''

References

British bandleaders
Possibly living people
Year of birth missing